Smethwick Green is a hamlet near Congleton in Cheshire in England. Until 2009 it formed part of the Brereton Ward of Congleton district but, on the creation Cheshire East unitary authority area, it became part of the Congleton Rural Ward.

Hamlets in Cheshire
Borough of Cheshire East